Brandýsek is a municipality and village in Kladno District in the Central Bohemian Region of the Czech Republic. It has about 2,100 inhabitants.

Administrative parts
The village of Olšany is an administrative part of Brandýsek.

Notable people
Alois Dryák (1872–1932), architect

References

Villages in Kladno District